The Human from Nowhere is a 1961 Soviet comedy film directed by Eldar Ryazanov.

Plot 
The geologist of the anthropological expedition, Vladimir Porazhaev, is among the savages of the fantastic Tapi tribe and escapes with the help of his intellectual abilities.

Cast 
 Sergey Yursky as Chudak
 Yury Yakovlev as Vladimir Porazhayev
 Anatoliy Papanov as Krokhalyov
 Lyudmila Gurchenko as Lena
 Anatoly Adoskin as Mikhail
 Vladimir Muravyov as police captain
 Yuri Belov as Gavrilov
 Yuri Nikulin	as 	petty officer
 Georgy Millyar as electrician
 Georgi Kulikov as assistant director at the theater
 Yevgeny Morgunov as Tapi cook

Censored 
At the XXII Congress of the CPSU on October 24, 1961, Mikhail Suslov condemned Ryazanov's film. After Suslov’s performance, the film was stopped everywhere and then banned. The ban was lifted only in 1988 by a decision of the Goskino of the USSR and the conflict committee of the Union of Cinematographers of the USSR, after which the film was again shown in cinemas.

References

External links 
 

1961 films
1960s Russian-language films
1960s science fiction comedy films
Soviet science fiction comedy films
Mosfilm films
Films directed by Eldar Ryazanov
1961 comedy films